Setnica is a settlement that is divided between the municipalities of Dobrova–Polhov Gradec and Medvode in the Upper Carniola region of Slovenia.

Geography

Setnica includes the hamlets of Ravnek to the south, Mežnar below Saint Ursula's Church, and Kobilca in the Maček Gorge. The highest point in the village is Grmada Hill, which stands to the east.

Name
Setnica is known as Snica in the local dialect. In the 19th century it was known as Setnitza in German.

Church

The local church, built on a hill above the settlement, is dedicated to Saint Ursula. It was first mentioned in documents dating to 1526. The rectangular nave dates to the early sixteenth century. The belfry was added later. The altar dates from 1685 and the church was remodeled in the Baroque style in the 18th century.

Unmarked grave

Setnica is the site of an unmarked grave from the period immediately after the Second World War. The Serbian Officer's Grave lies on a mountain path about 230 m northeast of the farm at Setnica no. 10. It contains the remains of a Serbian officer from the Serbian Volunteer Corps that was shot in May 1945 after fleeing from the prison in Šentvid, Ljubljana.

Notable people
Notable people that were born or lived in Setnica include:
Jernej Trnovec (1846–1933), wood carver

References

External links

Setnica on Geopedia

Populated places in the Municipality of Dobrova-Polhov Gradec